Jeong Jeom-sik (born 22 April 1968) is a South Korean former cyclist. He competed in the team pursuit event at the 1988 Summer Olympics.

References

1968 births
Living people
South Korean male cyclists
Olympic cyclists of South Korea
Cyclists at the 1988 Summer Olympics
Place of birth missing (living people)
Asian Games medalists in cycling
Asian Games bronze medalists for South Korea
Cyclists at the 1990 Asian Games
Medalists at the 1990 Asian Games
20th-century South Korean people
21st-century South Korean people